Pyes Pa is a suburb of Tauranga, New Zealand.

The suburb is located in the southern part of Tauranga about 40.3 km from Rotorua. It includes The Lakes, Cheyne Road and the TECT All Terrain Park.  It is named for Captain Charles Pye (1820 - 1876), who was in the Colonial Defence Force cavalry during the New Zealand Wars.

History

The New Zealand Wars battle site of Te Ranga is located in a paddock on Pyes Pa Road (SH36) near the corner of Joyce Road, about 10 km south of Tauranga. On 21 June 1864, British forces decisively defeated local Māori there.

The British defeat at Pukehinahina (Gate Pā) on 29 April 1864 had shocked New Zealand's European settlers.

Lieutenant-General Duncan Cameron returned to Auckland, leaving Lieutenant-Colonel Henry Greer in command of the British garrison on the Te Papa peninsula. Greer was ordered to attack immediately should Māori forces begin constructing another pā in the district.

On the morning of 21 June, Greer left Camp Te Papa (now the Tauranga CBD) with a force of 600 men. Five kilometres inland from Gate Pā, the British force discovered 500 to 600 Maori working on defensive earthworks at Te Ranga. Led by Rāwiri Puhirake, they comprised Ngāi Te Rangi and Ngāti Ranginui, supported by Ngāti Porou from the east coast and Ngāti Pikiao and Ngāti Rangiwewehi from Rotorua. Early that afternoon, following the arrival of reinforcements, Greer ordered men from the 68th and 43rd regiments and 1st Waikato Militia to advance.

The battle that followed was described as among the bloodiest of the New Zealand campaigns. In desperate hand-to-hand fighting, British troops exacted vengeance for Gate Pā. The Māori garrison was unable to hold the incomplete defences and, when Puhirake was killed, his force retreated.

British casualties were nine dead and 39 wounded. More than 100 of the defenders – including Puhirake – were buried in the trenches at Te Ranga. Twenty-seven severely wounded Māori were taken to hospital at Te Papa camp. Fourteen did not long survive the battle and were buried at Mission Cemetery. Among the mortally wounded was Te Tera of Ngāi Te Rangi, the only one identified in official reports.

The one-sided battle at Te Ranga largely crushed resistance in the vicinity of Tauranga Harbour. Some Ngāi Te Rangi and Ngāti Ranginui surrendered arms to the British at Camp Te Papa in ceremonies on 21 and 25 July. Much of their land was subsequently confiscated. This Historic Places Trust marker was erected at Te Ranga in 1964, 100 years after the battle.

Demographics

Pyes Pa had a population of 10,215 at the 2018 New Zealand census, an increase of 3,999 people (64.3%) since the 2013 census, and an increase of 6,966 people (214.4%) since the 2006 census. There were 3,513 households, comprising 4,875 males and 5,331 females, giving a sex ratio of 0.91 males per female, with 2,199 people (21.5%) aged under 15 years, 1,533 (15.0%) aged 15 to 29, 4,344 (42.5%) aged 30 to 64, and 2,142 (21.0%) aged 65 or older.

Ethnicities were 79.9% European/Pākehā, 11.3% Māori, 2.1% Pacific peoples, 14.1% Asian, and 1.9% other ethnicities. People may identify with more than one ethnicity.

The percentage of people born overseas was 27.8, compared with 27.1% nationally.

Although some people chose not to answer the census's question about religious affiliation, 44.9% had no religion, 39.5% were Christian, 0.8% had Māori religious beliefs, 1.6% were Hindu, 0.4% were Muslim, 0.7% were Buddhist and 6.0% had other religions.

Of those at least 15 years old, 1,671 (20.8%) people had a bachelor's or higher degree, and 1,308 (16.3%) people had no formal qualifications. 1,479 people (18.5%) earned over $70,000 compared to 17.2% nationally. The employment status of those at least 15 was that 3,753 (46.8%) people were employed full-time, 1,143 (14.3%) were part-time, and 225 (2.8%) were unemployed.

Education

The school was named in 1935 after the old school at Ngawaro was relocated to its current location. This building, a single classroom with a cold water tap on the porch and a donkey stove, was later used a dental clinic and then as a Playcentre. In 1956 the building was moved back to Ngawaro to serve as the present clubroom for the Ngawaro Golf Course.

It is a Intermediate Inclusive School, known as a Full Primary, which goes from Year 0 to Year 8.

References

Suburbs of Tauranga
Populated places in the Bay of Plenty Region
Bay of Plenty Region